Tha Pyay Kan Village is a village in Kawa Township, Bago Region, Myanmar. Almost all of the people are Burmese. It has a primary school for education. It is located at the near of Bago river. There is two Buddhist monasteries East Tha Pyay Kan Monastery and West Buddhist Monastery. As the 2014 census data, the population of the village is 1039.

Gallery

References

Populated places in Bago Region